NGTS-1b is a confirmed hot Jupiter-sized extrasolar planet orbiting NGTS-1, a red dwarf star about half the mass and radius of the Sun, every 2.65 days. The NGTS-1 system is about 600 light-years from Earth in the Columba constellation.

Discovery
The exoplanet, NGTS-1b, was discovered by the Next-Generation Transit Survey. Daniel Bayliss, of the University of Warwick, and lead author of the study describing the discovery of NGTS-1b, stated, "The discovery of NGTS-1b was a complete surprise to us—such massive planets were not thought to exist around such small stars—importantly, our challenge now is to find out how common these types of planets are in the Galaxy, and with the new Next-Generation Transit Survey facility we are well-placed to do just that."

Characteristics

Mass, radius and temperature
NGTS-1b is a hot Jupiter-sized gas giant exoplanet that has a mass of 0.812 MJ and a radius of 1.33 RJ, where MJ and RJ are the mass and radius of Jupiter.

Host star
The planet orbits an M0.5 dwarf star about half the mass and radius of the Sun.

Orbit 

See also 
 Kepler-45b
 List of extrasolar planets

References

External links 
 The Next Generation Transit Survey Becomes Operational at Paranal, ESO archive, The Messenger 165 – September 2016

Columba (constellation)
Exoplanets discovered in 2017
Hot Jupiters
M-type main-sequence stars
fr:NGTS-1_b#La_planète